This is a list of players who have played for Esteghlal Football Club.

Key
The list is ordered first by date of debut, and then if necessary in alphabetical order.
Statistics are correct up to and including the match played on 14 February 2021. Where a player left the club permanently after this date, his statistics are updated to his date of leaving.
Players highlighted in bold are still actively playing at Esteghlal.

World Cup Players

 1978 FIFA World Cup
  Iraj Danaeifard
  Andranik Eskandarian
  Hassan Nazari
  Hassan Rowshan

 1998 FIFA World Cup
  Parviz Boroumand
  Alireza Mansourian
  Mehdi Pashazadeh
  Javad Zarincheh 2006 FIFA World Cup
  Reza Enayati
  Amir Hossein Sadeghi
  Vahid Talebloo

 2014 FIFA World Cup
  Khosro Heydari
  Amir Hossein Sadeghi
  Andranik Teymourian
  Hashem Beikzadeh 2018 FIFA World Cup
  Rouzbeh Cheshmi
  Omid Ebrahimi
  Pejman Montazeri
  Majid Hosseini

 2022 FIFA World Cup
  Hossein Hosseini
  Rouzbeh Cheshmi
  Abolfazl Jalali

Olympic Players1972 Summer Olympics  Ali Jabbari
  Mansour Rashidi
  Javad Ghorab
  Javad Allahverdi1976 Summer Olympics'''
  Mansour Rashidi
  Hassan Nazari
  Andranik Eskandarian
  Hassan Rowshan
  Nasser Hejazi

List of players

List of goalscorers

Footnotes

References 

Esteghlal F.C.

Association football player non-biographical articles
Esteghlal